William Edward Jones (31 October 1916 – 25 July 1996) was a Welsh cricketer active from 1937 to 1958 who played for Glamorgan.

He appeared in 345 first-class matches as a left-handed batsman who bowled slow left-arm orthodox spin. He scored 13,536 runs with eleven centuries and took 192 wickets with a best performance of five for 50.

His highest score was 212 not out against Essex in 1948, when he put on 313 for the third wicket with Emrys Davies in three and a quarter hours. 1948 was his most successful season: he hit his only other double-century, 207 against Kent in 245 minutes, and scored 1656 runs in all matches at an average of 40.39, and took 47 wickets at 25.53, to help Glamorgan to their first County Championship.

He also played rugby union as a fly-half, representing Wales in an international match during World War II.

References

External links
 Willie Jones at CricketArchive
 

1916 births
1996 deaths
Cricketers from Carmarthen
Glamorgan cricketers
North v South cricketers
Rugby union players from Carmarthen
Welsh cricketers
Welsh rugby union players